Buttermilk pie is a pie in American cuisine. Associated with the cuisine of the Southern United States, it is one of the desperation pies, made using simple, staple ingredients.

It is similar to, and sometimes confused with, chess pie, but it does not include cornmeal. The basic filling consists of a mixture of sugar, butter, eggs, buttermilk, and wheat flour. Variations on the recipe include vanilla, lemon zest, nutmeg, and coconut. Buttermilk pies are made with a pie crust. The filling is poured into the crust and baked until the mixture sets. The pie is best eaten at room temperature after being allowed to cool, but may be eaten either warm from the oven or after being chilled.

See also
 
 Custard pie
 List of butter dishes
 List of pies, tarts and flans

References

American pies
Sweet pies
Custard desserts
Cuisine of the Southern United States
Foods featuring butter
Historical foods in American cuisine